Korparna (lit. The Ravens) is a 2011 novel by Swedish author Tomas Bannerhed. It won the August Prize in 2011.

A movie was released in 2017 on the book with name Ravens

References
2, https://www.imdb.com/title/tt5752524/plotsummary?ref_=tt_ov_pl

2011 Swedish novels
Swedish-language novels
August Prize-winning works
Novels set in Sweden